This is a listing of notable people born in, or notable for their association with, South Sumatra.



A
 Ambrizal, footballer who is currently playing for Persija (Palembang)
 Jules Ancion,  Dutch field hockey player who competed at the 1952 Summer Olympics (Palembang)
 Putty Armein, ten-pin bowler (Palembang)

C
 Choo Hoey, Singaporean musician and conductor (Palembang)

G
 Great Lady of Gresik, noblewoman (Palembang)

M
 A. T. Mahmud, renowned composer of 500 children's songs from Indonesia (Palembang)

N
 Alex Noerdin, Governor of South Sumatra (Palembang)

N
 Emil Salim, economist and former Minister of Indonesia (Lahat Regency)

R
 Hatta Rajasa, Coordinating Minister for Economic Affairs (Palembang)

S
 Shi Jin Qing, late 14th century chieftain (Palembang)

Y
 Tantowi Yahya, presenter, country singer and entrepreneur (Palembang)

South Sumatra